Ayaka Ikehara (born 24 September 1990) is a Japanese handball player for Odense Håndbold and the Japanese national team.

Achievements 
Carpathian Trophy:
Bronze Medalist: 2019

Individual awards  
 All-Star Right Wing of Damehåndboldligaen: 2017/18

References

External links

1990 births
Living people
Japanese female handball players
Sportspeople from Okinawa Prefecture
Expatriate handball players
Japanese expatriate sportspeople in Denmark
Ryukyuan people
Handball players at the 2020 Summer Olympics